The 2010–11 Serie A (known as the Serie A TIM for sponsorship reasons) was the 109th season of top-tier Italian football, the 79th in a round-robin tournament, and the 1st since its organization under a league committee separate from Serie B. It began on 28 August 2010 and ended on 22 May 2011. Internazionale were the defending champions.

Milan won the 2010–11 Serie A and their 18th league title overall with a scoreless draw away to Roma on 7 May 2011. This result ensured that with two rounds remaining Milan's nearest rival Internazionale could only draw level on points, and Milan holds the tiebreaker based on their better head-to-head record. The result prompted celebrations at Milan's Piazza del Duomo. The trophy was presented at Milan's next home game on 14 May.

It was Milan's first Scudetto since 2004 and it ended a run of five successive Serie A titles by their rival Internazionale. It was the first league title for manager Massimiliano Allegri, winning in his first year with Milan and who was for many a surprise choice as manager. Milan led the table for most of the season and secured the title with two games remaining. Notably, they defeated defending champions Internazionale twice during the season and also did the same to third place challenger Napoli. Milan were credited for strengthening their squad with Zlatan Ibrahimović and Robinho in the summer as well as picking up Antonio Cassano and Mark van Bommel in January.

This would be the last Scudetto not won by Juventus until the 2020–21 Serie A.

Rule changes
The rules for the registration of non-EU (or non-EFTA or Swiss) nationals transferred from abroad were revised in the summer of 2010 and announced on 2 July 2010. Clubs could only sign one (rather than two previously) non-EU player and that player could only be signed if a current member of the squad who was not an EU national had been sold or sold abroad. The late announcement of this rule change meant that some clubs had to cancel incoming transfers. Parma, for example, were to sign both Colombian Pablo Armero from Brazilian side Palmeiras, who subsequently signed for Udinese instead, and Brazilian agency player Zé Eduardo, but had to choose between them and eventually transferred the latter. Their outgoing transfer was Julio César de León, who moved to Chinese team Shandong Luneng Taishan.

Teams
The league featured 17 teams returning from the 2009–10 Serie A, plus three teams promoted from 2009–10 Serie B (two as direct promotions, one as playoff winners). On 30 May 2010, Lecce and Cesena won direct promotion to the Serie A by finishing first and second, respectively. Brescia became the third Serie B team promoted on 13 June 2010 by winning the promotion playoff final 2–1 on aggregate over Torino. It was a quick turn-around for Lecce, which spent only one year in Serie B after being relegated from the 2008–09 Serie A. Cesena last played in Serie A in 1990–91, while Brescia played five seasons in Serie B after being relegated from A in 2004–05.

Personnel and sponsorship

Managerial changes

League table

Results

Top goalscorers

Hat-tricks

4 Player scored four goals

Number of teams by region

References

Serie A seasons
Italy
1